Mariana Foglia (born June 28, 1982) is an Uruguayan sailor. She and Pablo Defazio placed 17th in the Nacra 17 event at the 2016 Summer Olympics.

References

1982 births
Living people
Uruguayan female sailors (sport)
Olympic sailors of Uruguay
Sailors at the 2016 Summer Olympics – Nacra 17
World champions in sailing for Uruguay
Snipe class female world champions